chess24.com is an Internet chess server in English and nine other languages, established in 2014 by German grandmaster Jan Gustafsson and Enrique Guzman. Among people collaborating with chess24 are World Champions, Grandmasters and International Masters including Magnus Carlsen, Viswanathan Anand, Peter Svidler, Rustam Kasimdzhanov, Francisco Vallejo Pons, David Antón Guijarro, Laurent Fressinet, Dorsa Derakhshani, Lawrence Trent, Sopiko Guramishvili, and Hou Yifan.

In March 2019, chess24 merged with Magnus Carlsen's company Play Magnus AS in a transaction that made the former chess24 owners the largest shareholders in Play Magnus.

In 2022, Play Magnus was purchased by Chess.com, which makes chess.com the owner of chess24.

Features 
A 2020 review by IM Luis Torres put chess24 as one of the three most popular internet chess servers, alongside Chess.com and Lichess. Similarly to other chess servers, Chess24 offers the ability to play online against other users or bots, enter online tournaments hosted on the site and view your own statistics. Torres ranked Chess.com the best overall, but Chess24 as the best for improving one's game.

There is also an option of "going premium" (paying for membership) on Chess24. Going premium allows deeper Stockfish analysis and also participation in events such as Banter Blitz, which allows Premium members to play with collaborators of Chess24. Reviews have tended to favour rivals Chess.com and Lichess in terms of the playing experience, while suggesting that Chess24 has richer educational video content.

Tournaments
Chess24 provides live coverage of major international tournaments on the website and also on YouTube with commentary by players such as Yasser Seirawan, Peter Leko, and Tania Sachdev. They also host and sponsor their own events, especially since their acquisition by Play Magnus AS. From September 2019 to April 2020, Chess24 held the first international Banter Blitz Cup, an online Blitz Chess tournament featuring players such as Magnus Carlsen, Gata Kamsky, RameshBabu Praggnanandhaa, Parham Maghsoodloo, David Antón Guijarro and Leinier Domínguez with a $50,000 prize pool for players and $5,000 for streamers. It was won by Alireza Firouzja in the final against Magnus Carlsen.

From April to May 2020, Chess24 held the Magnus Carlsen Invitational, an online Rapid Chess tournament which was won by Magnus Carlsen. This was expanded to form a conceptual tour including the Lindores Abbey Rapid Challenge, and culminating in a Grand Final, featuring Magnus Carlsen and Hikaru Nakamura. The 2021 edition was hosted in March 2021, also online, and saw the favourite Magnus Carlsen being knocked out in the semifinal by Ian Nepomniachtchi, who eventually lost in the final to Dutch Grandmaster and World Championship Candidate Anish Giri.

See also
List of Internet chess servers
Rules of chess

References

Chess databases
Internet chess servers
German websites